Nipper (1884 – September 1895) was a dog from Bristol, England, who served as the model for an 1898 painting by Francis Barraud titled His Master's Voice. This image became one of the world's best known trademarks, the famous dog-and-gramophone pairing that was used by several record companies and their associated company brands, including Berliner Gramophone and its various affiliates and successors, among them Berliner's German subsidiary Deutsche Grammophon; Berliner's American successor the Victor Talking Machine Co. (later known as RCA Victor and then RCA Records);  Zonophone; Berliner's (and later Victor's) British affiliate the Gramophone Co. Ltd. (informally known as His Master's Voice) and its successors EMI and HMV Retail Ltd.; the Gramophone Co.'s German subsidiary Electrola; and onetime Victor subsidiary the Japan Victor Company (JVC).

Biography 
Nipper was born in 1884 in Bristol, England, and died in September 1895. He was likely a mixed-breed dog, although most early sources suggest that he was a Smooth Fox Terrier, or perhaps a Jack Russell Terrier, or possibly "part Bull Terrier". He was named Nipper because he would often "nip" at the backs of visitors' legs.

Nipper originally lived with his owner, Mark Henry Barraud, in the Prince's Theatre where Barraud was a scenery designer. When Barraud died in 1887, his brothers Philip and Francis took care of the dog, then Francis took Nipper to Liverpool, and later to Mark's widow  in Kingston upon Thames, Surrey. Nipper died of natural causes in 1895 and was buried in Kingston upon Thames at Clarence Street, in a small park surrounded by magnolia trees. As time progressed, the area was built upon, and a branch of Lloyds Bank now occupies the site. On the wall of the bank, just inside the entrance, a brass plaque commemorates the terrier that lies beneath the building.

On 10 March 2010, a small road near to the dog's final resting place in Kingston upon Thames was officially named Nipper Alley in commemoration of this well-known resident.

Advertising icon
In 1898, three years after Nipper's death, Francis Barraud, his last owner and brother of his first owner, painted a picture of Nipper listening intently to an electric Edison-Bell cylinder phonograph.  Thinking the Edison-Bell Company located in New Jersey, United States, might find it useful, he offered it to James E. Hough, who promptly replied, "Dogs don't listen to phonographs". On 31 May 1899, Barraud went to the Maiden Lane offices of The Gramophone Company to inquire about borrowing a brass horn to replace the original black horn in order to brighten up the painting. When Gramophone Company founder and manager William Barry Owen was shown the painting, he suggested that if the artist painted out the cylinder machine and replaced it with a Berliner disc gramophone, he would buy the painting. Barraud obliged, and the image soon became the successful trademark of the Victor and Gramophone Company Ltd. record labels, and eventually the Radio Corporation of America, after the acquisition of the Victor company in 1929, Electric and Musical Industries Limited in 1931, and HMV. Emile Berliner registered the trademark for use in the United States on 10 July 1900. 

The slogan "His Master's Voice", along with the painting, was sold to The Gramophone Company for £100 – half for the copyright and half for the physical painting itself. The original oil painting hung in the EMI boardroom in Hayes, Middlesex, for many years.

It appears that after the copyright was sold to Gramophone, two employees of the company, William Sinkler Darby and Theodore Bernard Birnbaum, recorded a Mutoscope in 1900 entitled 'Nipper runs amok!'. Since Nipper died in 1895, a replacement dog was used.

Logo variations

Legacy 

The iconic image of a terrier-mix dog, Nipper, looking into a phonograph became an international symbol of quality and excellence for the Victor Talking Machine Company and later RCA Victor. Throughout his existence as one of the world's best-known trademarks, endless novelty and promotional items featuring Nipper have been produced; from pocket watches, paperweights and  cigar lighters to fountain pens, coffee mugs and T-shirts, Nipper advertising items have long been popular collectables. Though the trademark's usage has been reduced in recent years, Nipper lives on through the RCA and HMV brand names; he has even appeared in RCA ads on television with his "son", a puppy named Chipper who was added to the RCA family in 1991. Real dogs continue to play the roles of Nipper and Chipper, but Chipper has to be replaced much more frequently, since his character is a puppy.

Nipper continues to be the mascot of HMV stores in countries where the entertainment retailer has the rights to him. Both RCA Records and EMI have reduced the use of Nipper in the global music market due to the fragmented ownership of the trademark.

Victor Company of Japan (JVC) also uses the logo within Japan, which includes the "His Master's Voice" slogan.

A four-ton Nipper can be seen on the roof of the old RTA (former RCA distributor) building now owned by Arnoff Moving & Storage and located at 991 Broadway in Albany, New York. A second, slightly smaller one was purchased by Jim Wells from RCA in Baltimore for $1. After spending many years on private property in Nipper Park in Merrifield, Virginia, perched over Lee Highway (U.S. Route 29), it has now been returned to Baltimore, Maryland, where it originally graced the former RCA Building on Russell Street. Nipper now sits atop the Maryland Historical Society building at Park Avenue and West Centre Street in Baltimore. Though smaller than the Albany Nipper, Baltimore's includes a gramophone for Nipper to listen to. The Baltimore Nipper was saved when the Virginia site where he briefly resided was sold to developers. It is currently the location of a group of town-houses. The street leading to the development is named Nipper Way.

A small statue of Nipper can be seen perched above a doorway in the Merchant Venturers Building on the corner of Park Row and Woodland Road in Bristol; this building, part of the University of Bristol, stands near the site of the old Prince's Theatre.

A life-sized ornament of Nipper appears in the music video to Cyndi Lauper's song "Time After Time".

In May 2017, the City of Albany held a contest for various groups or artists to submit designs for creative, painted Nipper statues which were placed throughout the city. Ten of the contestants were chosen to create ten Nipper statues – which were displayed for one year and then auctioned off for charity.

See also
 List of individual dogs

References

External links 

 "Little Nipper" background at RCA Global Communications, New York City
 
 RCA Building, Albany, NY
 Koenigsberg, Allen (June 2022). "Nipper's Arrival in the New World". Academia.
 Musée des ondes Emile Berliner

1884 animal births
1895 animal deaths
Advertising characters
Individual dogs
RCA brands
Technicolor SA
English artists' models
Dog mascots
Music mascots